Pegasus Aviation may refer to:

Pegasus Aviation, UK ultralight trike manufacturer
Pegasus Aviation Finance Company
Pegasus Aviation (NZ) Ltd - an engine manufacturer